The 2006–07 Minnesota Golden Gophers men's basketball team represented the University of Minnesota in the college basketball season of 2006–2007. The team's head coach, Dan Monson, began his eighth season with the Gophers only to resign after a 2 win, 5 loss start.  Assistant coach Jim Molinari took over for the remainder of the season on an interim basis. The Golden Gophers played their home games at Williams Arena in Minneapolis, Minnesota and are members of the Big Ten Conference.

Season
Coming off of a short NIT run at the end of the previous season, the Gophers, with no seniors on the roster, began 2006 in a slump.  After losing 4 straight games, the final 3 at the inaugural Old Spice Classic in Orlando to take last place, the Gophers were beaten badly at home by Clemson on November 29.  Head coach Dan Monson announced the next day that he would resign from his coaching duties, stating, "It's time for somebody else to make the next step and that's to have more success on the court than I had." Assistant coach Jim Molinari was appointed as interim head coach, but the Gophers could never quite get their season started, finishing with a disappointing 9 wins and 22 losses.

Roster

2006–07 Schedule and results

|-
! colspan="6" style="text-align: center; background:#800000" | Exhibition 

|-
! colspan="6" style="text-align: center; background:#800000"|Regular Season 

|-
! colspan="6" style="text-align: center; background:#800000"|Big Ten Regular Season 

|-
! colspan="6" style="text-align: center; background:#800000"|2007 Big Ten tournament

Rankings

The 2006–07 Minnesota Golden Gophers basketball team was not ranked during the season.

References

Minnesota Golden Gophers men's basketball seasons
Minnesota
2006 in sports in Minnesota
2007 in sports in Minnesota